Afghan art has spanned many centuries. In contrast to its independence and isolation in recent centuries, ancient and medieval Afghanistan spent long periods as part of large empires, which mostly also included parts of modern Pakistan and north India, as well as Iran. Afghan cities were often sometimes among the capitals or main cities of these, as with the Kushan Empire, and later the Mughal Empire.  In addition some routes of the Silk Road to and from China pass through Afghanistan, bringing influences from both the east and west. 

One of the most significant periods is the Gandharan art made between the 1st and 7th centuries developing out of Greco-Buddhist art.  With the arrival of Islam, later  Afghanistan was for long periods part of Persianate states, and its art was often an important part of Persian art and Islamic art in general.

Since the 1900s, the nation began to use Western techniques in art. Afghanistan's art in many media was originally almost entirely done by men, although women were greatly involved in other media, but recently women are entering the arts programs at Kabul University. Art is largely centred at the National Museum of Afghanistan, the National Gallery of Afghanistan and the National Archives of Afghanistan in Kabul. There are a number of art schools in the country. The Center for Contemporary Arts Afghanistan (CCAA) in Kabul provides young people an opportunity to learn contemporary painting.

In recent decades, war and deliberate iconoclasm have caused a great amount of destruction of Afghanistan's artistic heritage.

Metalwork
 
A collection of over 20,600 gold ornaments, some of them dating back to the Bronze Age, was discovered in Afghanistan in the late 1970s.  Known as the Bactrian Hoard, these coins, necklaces and other pieces of jewelry were found in burial mounts in Sheberghan in Jowzjan Province.  They have been displayed in museums in the US and Europe.  The Oxus Treasure, with objects probably of about 400-200 BCE, was found immediately across the border with Afghanistan, on the opposite bank of the Oxus River.

Greco-Buddhist Art

Afghanistan, the core territory of the Greco-Bactrian Kingdom (c. 250-125 BCE) was a key centre of Greco-Buddhist art from the 4th Century BCE to around the 7th Century CE, when it ceased after the Islamic Conquest.  Large numbers of  artworks have been found at the archaeological site of Hadda, Afghanistan. The 6th-century Buddhas of Bamiyan are a well-known example of Gandhara art from this period. They were destroyed by the Taliban in 2001.

The 1st-century Bimaran casket (now British Museum) is a gold Buddhist casket for relics, an example of Kushan art, as are the Begram ivories, mostly secular survivals from a palace storeroom swept by fire in the 2nd century. These are part of the Treasure of Begram and the ivories are mounts for furniture and similar pieces, showing a very refined and luxurious palace lifestyle.  Many may have been made in Gandhara, as well as India. The treasure has many imported items, including Roman enamelled glass.

Islamic Art

After the Islamic conquest of Afghanistan, a slow process mostly completed from the west in the 7th century, Afghan art changed dramatically from previous Greco-Buddhist works, due to the adoption of Islam. Afghan local materials such as lapis lazuli were adapted for use in Islamic art. The Ghazni Minarets (12th century) and Minaret of Jam (c. 1190) are examples of fine brick and tile work on high minarets or "victory towers".  Mosques built in Afghanistan and in the Arab world are built with elaborate tiling styles. Many of these styles were influenced from Chinese ceramics  Afghanistan served as a conduit for introduction to these Chinese ceramic styles and techniques due to its strategic location on the Silk Road.

Performance Art
Buz-baz is a form of musical puppetry found in Afghanistan.  The puppeteer manipulates a markhor marionette while simultaneously playing a dambura.

Fine Art
Afghanistan fine art was protected during the Taliban times by art masters at the Senai Art School.  The professors often hid "un-Islamic" paintings from the Taliban when they would visit and inspect. Other artists used water color over oil paintings to conceal faces and images not approved by the Taliban. Since 2002, the Afghan fine art master painters have been able to conduct many more exhibitions within Central Asia and Europe. Their oil and water color paintings are often found in the realism style, as that is what most Afghans prefer.

Modern Art
Since the fall of the Taliban in 2001, contemporary art has seen a resurgence in Afghanistan.  Beginning in 2009, international funding for the arts has flowed into Afghanistan from the United States and Europe. In 2012, Kabul-based artist Aman Mojadidi curated a 2012 Documenta exhibit in Kabul which showcased 12 contemporary Afghan artists whose work includes digital photography, textiles, abstract painting, filmmaking and mixed media.

ArtLords are a group of around 45 Afghan artists who have painted murals in 19 provinces of Afghanistan. Starting in 2014, by 2019 they had painted over 2000 murals, ranging in size from 3x5 to 6x18 meters.

See also 
 List of Afghan artists

References

Afghan art